Four star, 4 star, **** or similar may refer to:

Quality grading system
Four star grade in a Star (classification) system, such as for films, TV shows, restaurants, and hotels
 Hotel rating
 Restaurant rating
 UEFA stadium categories

Art, literature and entertainment
 Four-Star Spectacular, a 1970s comic book series
 4-Star, a ZX spectrum game by J. K. Greye Software
 Four Star Mary, an alternative rock group formed in California in 1997
 4 Star Records, a 1950s country music record label
 Four Stars (album), by The Greenhornes (2010)
 Four Stars (1967 film), a film by Andy Warhol
 Four Stars (2006 film), a French comedy film
 Four Star Television (also Four Star Films, Four Star Productions, and Four Star International), an American TV production company (1952–1989)
 Four Star Playhouse, American TV anthology series 1952–1956
 Four Star Playhouse (radio program), American radio anthology series 1949
 Four Star Revue, American variety/comedy program 1950–1953

Businesses
 Four Star Air Cargo, a former cargo airline based in Puerto Rico
 Four Star Pizza, an Irish fast food company
 Fourstar clothing, part of Girl Distribution Company

Other uses
 ****, indicating a censored Four-letter word
 Four-star rank, senior military rank
 Star of IV-class luminosity, a Stellar classification
 Four star petrol, a class of leaded petrol sold in the UK until 2000
 Four Stars, a name of 4 of the Bob Hope British Classic golf tournaments

See also
 4-Starr Collection, 1995 EP by Ringo Starr